Cosmopterix epizona is a moth of the family Cosmopterigidae. It is known from Australia and Fiji.

References

epizona